Gonometa bicolor is a moth of the  family Lasiocampidae. It is known from Angola.

References

Gonometa
Insects of Angola
Fauna of Gabon
Moths of Africa
Moths described in 1881